Lake Tuz ( meaning 'Salt Lake'; anciently Tatta —) was the second largest lake in Turkey with its 
surface area and one of the largest hypersaline lakes in the world. In recent years, Lake Tuz has become a hotspot for tourists. In October 2021, Lake Tuz dried up completely.

Geography

The lake, occupying a tectonic depression in the central plateau of Turkey, is fed by two major streams, groundwater, and surface water, but has no outlet. Brackish marshes have formed where channels and streams enter the lake. Arable fields surround the lake, except in the south and southwest where extensive seasonally flooded salt-steppe occurs.

For most of the year, it is very shallow (approx.). During winter part of the salt is dissolved in the fresh water that is introduced to the lake by precipitation and surface runoff (to 324‰ salinity). During the summer the lake dries up exposing an average of 30 cm thick salt layer in August. This mechanism is used as a basis for the process of the salt mines in the lake. The three mines operating in the lake produce 63% of the salt consumed in Turkey. The salt mining generates industrial activity in the region, mainly related to salt processing and refining.

Geology

Formation 
Subsidence in the Tuz Gölü Lower Basin occurred during the Upper Senonian-Lower Middle Eocene and was followed by a regression that started in the upper Eocene and continued until the end of the Oligocene. During the Upper Senonian-Lower Middle Eocene, the Tuz Gölü Lower Basin formed a single and continuous depression towards the north with the Haymana region. The Haymana Basin, which rose after the deposition of the Middle Eocene Nummulitic limestones, separated the Tuz Gölü Basin with a fault zone along the eastern edge of the Karacadağ uplift.

The connection of Tuz Gölü with the north-northeast Çankırı basin occurred during the Pliocene period and continued throughout the Middle Eocene-Oligocene, when the lake basin became a graben bounded by the north-west and north-east fault zones. After the main deformation in the late Oligocene or Miocene period, local depositional basins were formed during the Neogene period, and volcanics of varying thickness and terrestrial sediments including lake limestones were deposited in these basins. The Tuz Gölü Basin has been little affected by the recent Alpine compressional movements in the Pliocene. Tension movements that took place in the Neogene and continued until the Pliocene caused volcanic activities dating back to historical times.

Geological structure 

It can be said that Tuz Gölü has a unique geological structure. In the geological structure of the lake, there is a salt layer of different densities that continues continuously for 1,000 meters. This layer ensures the continuity of salt production around the lake, in other words, it extends the commercial life of the salt industry in the region.

In the Tuz Gölü Basin, there is a 10 km-thick stacking with age varying from the Upper Cretaceous to the present. While units such as shale, sandstone, pebble stone and limestone, which generally have flysch character and interact with each other in vertical and lateral directions, were deposited in the deep parts of the basin, it was revealed by the researchers that terrestrial and shallow marine units in the marginal parts were also deposited.

Conglomerate and sandstones, which are high energy products, were deposited in shallow marine and terrestrial environments, and shale, limestone, gypsum and anhydrites were formed in calm periods. The basement rock units, Temirözü, Mollaresul formations, Ankara complex and Kırşehir crystalline complex in the north and northeast of the Tuz Gölü Basin, and low-grade metamorphics in the west and southwest constitute.

Climate 

The basin of Lake Tuz is influenced by cold semi-arid steppe (Bsk) and Mediterranean (Csa and Csb) climates. Northern areas of the basin such as Kulu are wetter and show a Mediterranean characteristic, meanwhile more southern areas like Çumra, Aksaray and Karapınar have a steppe climate. The area is generally sheltered from moisture-bearing air masses behind the Taurus Mountains. The average yearly precipitation in the basin is 324 mm, thus making the region one of the driest in Turkey.

History

Anciently, the lake was called Tatta, and was located on the frontiers between ancient Lycaonia and Galatia; it had originally belonged to Phrygia, but was afterwards annexed to Lycaonia. The ancients reported that its waters were so impregnated with brine, that any substance dipped into it, was immediately encrusted with a thick coat of salt; even birds flying near the surface had their wings moistened with the saline particles, so as to become incapable of rising into the air, and to be easily caught. Stephanus of Byzantium speaks of a salt lake in Phrygia, which he calls Attaea (Ἄτταια), near which there was a town called Botieum, and which is probably the settlements of Şereflikoçhisar or Eskil.

Pre-history
Pre-historical Lake Tatta was originally a much larger freshwater lake with numerous rivers flowing in and out of it, that dominated the Central Anatolian interior. Lush with vegetation, the region sprung up some of the earliest known civilizations including the Hittites and Anatolian people. After the last Ice age between 11,000 and 5,000 years ago, the Central Anatolian steppe began to gradually transform into its current form.

Flora and fauna 

In 2001, Lake Tuz was declared a specially protected area, including all of the lake surface and surrounding waterbeds and some of the important neighboring steppe areas. The main Turkish breeding colony of greater flamingo (Phoenicopterus roseus) is present on a group of islands in the southern part of the lake. Greater white-fronted goose (Anser albifrons) is the second largest breeder here. Lesser kestrel (Falco naumanni) is a common breeder in surrounding villages.

Gallery

See also
 List of lakes of Turkey
 Lake Tuz Facility
 Lake Tuz Natural Gas Storage

References

External links
 

Tuz
Tuz, Lake
Central Anatolia Region
World Heritage Tentative List for Turkey
Landforms of Aksaray Province
Important Bird Areas of Turkey